The 2022–23 Miami RedHawks men's ice hockey season was the 45th season of play for the program and the 10th in the NCHC conference. The RedHawks represented Miami University and were coached by Chris Bergeron, in his 4th season.

Season

Departures

Recruiting

Roster
As of June 30, 2022.

Standings

Schedule and results

|-
!colspan=12 style=";" | Regular Season

|-
!colspan=12 style=";" |

Scoring statistics

Goaltending statistics

Rankings

References

2022-23
Miami RedHawks
Miami RedHawks
Miami RedHawks
Miami RedHawks